Ivy Forster (1907 – June 1997) was a politician from Jersey. During World War II she and her family sheltered Russian forced labourers brought to the islands by the Nazis, activity that resulted in her sister being killed in a concentration camp. After the war, Forster was elected to the States in 1948, becoming its first female member.

Biography
Forster was born in 1907, one of nine children of the seaman Vincent Le Druillenec.

During World War II and the German occupation of the Channel Islands, both she and her sister Louisa sheltered Russian forced labourers. Forster and her husband Arthur took in Grigori Koslov in December 1942, with Koslov living in their attic. In 1944 a letter informing the Germans about Louisa sheltering another Russian, Feodor Buryi, was intercepted. Although Buryi was moved to Ivy's house, the Geheime Feldpolizei found evidence of his stay at Louisa's home. Louisa was arrested on 25 May and Ivy a week later, by which time Buryi had moved on. Their brother Harold was later arrested as he had been seen visiting Louisa. All three were convicted; Louisa and Harold were initially jailed in France, before being sent to concentration camps; Louisa died in Ravensbrück concentration camp, while Harold was a survivor of Bergen-Belsen. Ivy was spared deportation due to being given an exemption on health grounds after a doctor pretended that she was suffering from tuberculosis and instead served her prison sentence in Jersey. Koslov and Buryi both survived the war. The events were later made into a film, Another Mother's Son, released in 2017.

In 1948 she contested elections to the States in the Saint Helier constituency and became the first woman elected to the island's legislature. She was re-elected in 1951, but lost her seat in 1954. She died in June 1997 at the age of 90. After her death she was named as one of the 29 British Heroes of the Holocaust.

References

1907 births
Jersey women in politics
1997 deaths
Deputies of Jersey